Casalborgone is a comune (municipality) in the Metropolitan City of Turin in the Italian region Piedmont, located about  northeast of Turin.

Casalborgone borders the following municipalities: San Sebastiano da Po, Lauriano, Castagneto Po, Rivalba, Tonengo, Aramengo, Berzano di San Pietro, and Cinzano.

References

External links
 Official website

Cities and towns in Piedmont